Far East Film Festival is an annual film festival held in Udine, Italy. It is one of the most important events promoting Asian Cinema in Europe. It focuses mainly on the films from East Asia.

Audience Award

References

External links 
Official Festival Website
 

Film festivals in Italy